Maged Mohamed (born 10 August 1962) is an Egyptian weightlifter. He competed in the men's middle heavyweight event at the 1984 Summer Olympics.

References

1962 births
Living people
Egyptian male weightlifters
Olympic weightlifters of Egypt
Weightlifters at the 1984 Summer Olympics
Place of birth missing (living people)